The Robbins problem may mean either of:
 the Robbins conjecture that all Robbins algebras are Boolean algebras.
 Robbins' problem of optimal stopping in probability theory.